The 2001 State Farm Women's Tennis Classic was a women's tennis tournament played on outdoor hard courts in Scottsdale, Arizona in the United States and was part of Tier II of the 2001 WTA Tour. It was the second edition of the tournament and ran from February 26 through March 4, 2001. First-seeded Lindsay Davenport won the singles title and earned $90,000 first-prize money.

Finals

Singles

 Lindsay Davenport defeated  Meghann Shaughnessy 6–2, 6–3
 It was Davenport's 2nd singles title of the year and the 32nd of her career.

Doubles

 Lisa Raymond /  Rennae Stubbs defeated  Kim Clijsters /  Meghann Shaughnessy by walkover
 It was Raymond's 2nd title of the year and the 22nd of her career. It was Stubbs' 2nd title of the year and the 26th of her career.

References

External links
 ITF tournament edition details
 Tournament draws

State Farm Women's Tennis Classic
State Farm Women's Tennis Classic
2001 in American tennis
2001 in sports in Arizona